The 1999 British Rally Championship was a rallying championship season for rally cars conforming to F2 and
Group N Regulations, with only the F2 teams and drivers eligible to win the overall title. The championship was won
by Finland's Tapio Laukkanen ahead of former champion Gwyndaf Evans and 1998 Champion Martin Rowe. The Manufacturers title was won by Renault.

Calendar

Driver Changes

Alister McRae left Volkswagen to join Hyundai in the World Rally Championship

McRae was replaced by Mark Higgins after Nissan's withdrawal from Rallying

Ford withdrew their works team from the championship

Future WRC Star Toni Gardemeister joined SEAT's BRC Team

Raimund Baumschlager joined the Volkswagen Team

Robbie Head left the series

Leading Entries

Drivers Championship

Manufacturers Championship

References
Mobil 1 British Rally Championship 1999 VHS Review: Duke Video Marketing Ltd., Isle of Man

External links 
 http://archive.djames.org.uk/1999/vauxhall/entry.html
 http://archive.djames.org.uk/1999/mobil.html

British Rally Championship seasons
Rally Championship
British Rally Championship